Murray is an unincorporated community in Lancaster Township, Wells County, in the U.S. state of Indiana.

History
An old variant name of the community was called New Lancaster. A post office was established at Murray in 1837, and remained in operation until 1902.

On February 29, 1996, Murray was inadvertently strafed by a military aircraft, though no injuries resulted.

Geography

References

External links
  The strafing of Murray

Unincorporated communities in Wells County, Indiana
Unincorporated communities in Indiana
Fort Wayne, IN Metropolitan Statistical Area